The 1934 Oregon State Beavers football team represented Oregon State University in the Pacific Coast Conference (PCC) during the 1934 college football season.  In their second season under head coach Lon Stiner, the Beavers compiled a 3–6–2 record (0–5–2 against PCC opponents), finished in ninth place in the PCC, and were outscored by their opponents, 131 to 104.  The team played its home games at Bell Field in Corvallis, Oregon.

Schedule

References

Oregon State
Oregon State Beavers football seasons
Oregon State Beavers football